"Apocalypse Then" is the tenth and final episode of the eighth season of the anthology television series American Horror Story. It aired on November 14, 2018, on the cable network FX. The episode was written by Ryan Murphy & Brad Falchuk, and directed by Bradley Buecker.

Plot
Myrtle infiltrates Jeff and Mutt's lab to ensure Coco and her family have a place at Outpost 3 after the apocalypse. She and Cordelia cast identity spells on Coco and Mallory so they can live in the Outpost undetected by Michael. When Mallory's powers emerge, the spells will be broken so she can perform the time-travel spell and go back in time to kill Michael before he can initiate the apocalypse. Madison realizes Dinah, the voodoo queen, betrayed the witches and defects to Michael. Cordelia decides to commit revenge after the apocalypse.

After the apocalypse; following the events of the witches' arrival at the outpost, Dinah asserts her loyalty to Michael, but her predecessor voodoo queen, Marie Laveau, has been released from hell by Papa Legba in exchange for Dinah's more corrupted soul. Marie kills Dinah and Cordelia detonates the robot Mead. With Michael distracted, Madison shoots him dead.

Before Michael can resurrect, Cordelia and Myrtle take Mallory to a safe place to begin the spell, but Mallory is stabbed by Brock leaving her too weak to perform the spell. Myrtle immolates Brock in retaliation as he falls to his death, distracting Madison long enough for Michael to resurrect. After reviving, Michael kills Madison, Marie, and Coco. Facing her last stand, Cordelia kills herself to confer her powers to Mallory, allowing her to initiate the spell.

Mallory arrives in 2015, and kills Michael while Constance Langdon watches and leaves him to die in the street, erasing the timeline of his rising to power.

Mallory arrives at the Robichaux Academy and meets the other witches for the first time from their perspective. With the timeline altered, Myrtle remains dead and Madison remains in hell (although Mallory says she will bring her back soon). Mallory also prevents Queenie from checking in to the Hotel Cortez to avoid her impending death. Out of gratitude to Mallory for dispatching Michael; Misty Day, accompanied by Nan, was released from her afterlife and returns to the school.

In 2020, Timothy and Emily, selected for Outpost 3 in the previous timeline, meet. Three years later, they have a child, named Devon, who eventually kills his nanny similar to Michael's first murder. Anton LaVey, Samantha Crowe, and Mead arrive at the house to meet the new Antichrist, claiming that they came to help.

Reception
"Apocalypse Then" was watched by 1.83 million people during its original broadcast, and gained a 0.8 ratings share among adults aged 18–49.

The episode received mostly positive reviews. On the review aggregator Rotten Tomatoes, "Apocalypse Then" holds a 79% approval rating, based on 24 reviews with an average rating of 8.30/10. The critical consensus reads, "Ryan Murphy goes full Ryan Murphy in "Apocalypse Then," barreling past two convoluted episodes of multiverse building to deliver a satisfying, batsh—t finale that lives up to its namesake."

Ron Hogan of Den of Geek gave the episode a 4/5, saying, "The finale of American Horror Story'''s most ambitious season manages to mash together two different series, marry separate mythologies, and somehow form a coherent season out of the chocolate and peanut butter of Murder House and Coven." He added, "Writers Ryan Murphy and Brad Falchuk aren't reinventing the wheel, but time travel does give the two an opportunity to bring back Jessica Lange as Constance again. Her exchanges with Michael are some of the best on the show" before concluding by "Even though the episode leans towards voiceover by the end, as Mallory explains her status as the Billy Pilgrim of the American Horror Story universe, it's still a very satisfying ending."

Kat Rosenfield from Entertainment Weekly gave the episode an A+. She was pleased by the end of the pre-apocalypse flashbacks, and the entire showdown between the witches and Langdon. She also enjoyed the return of Bassett's Marie Laveau and the demise of Dinah. She noticed and appreciated the "double sci-fi homage" during Robot Mead's destruction, describing it as "a Scanners-style body explosion, followed by a very Space Odyssey rendition of "Daisy, Daisy" by her dying, decapitated  head." Finally, she praised the return of Lange's Constance, commenting that "this finale was already A-grade material, but this second glorious cameo from Jessica Lange merits a "plus"."Vulture''s Ziwe Fumudoh gave the episode a 5 out of 5. Much like Rosenfield, she praised the return of Angela Bassett and Jessica Lange, commenting "do you understand how privileged we are to watch an episode of television with Angela Bassett, Jessica Lange, and Sarah Paulson?" She was a fan of the showdown between the witches and Langdon, even if the deaths of Madison, Marie and Coco were "laughable". She also enjoyed the death of Langdon, saying that "it's mean but so delicious", and Lange's "impeccable monologue" at the start of the scene. Finally, she liked the cliffhanger of the episode, as it gives "hope for another epic battle between witches, warlocks, and a Lucifer with luscious locks."

References

External links

 

American Horror Story: Apocalypse episodes